N'écoute pas les idoles is the first album by French singer France Gall. It was released on a 10-inch LP in March 1964.

Track listing

References 

France Gall albums
Philips Records albums
1964 albums